Shizhong District is a former district of the city of Jining in Shandong province, China. In November 2013 it was merged into Rencheng District.

References

County-level divisions of Shandong